The Ribnica Fortress is an Ottoman fortress, located in the Stara Varoš neighborhood of Podgorica, the capital city of Montenegro.

History 

The fortress was built in late 15th century (around 1477), during the period of Ottoman reign. It was built above the confluence of Ribnica and Morača rivers, and was one of 2 fortresses surrounding Stara Varoš.

For a long time, Depedogen was used as an ammunition warehouse. It was severely damaged in 1878, when a thunder strike triggered an explosion which destroyed a large part of the fortress's interior and exterior.

It is believed that the fortress stems from the 12th century, and that it's the birthplace of Stefan Nemanja - the founding father of the Nemanjić dynasty. Therefore, many call the fortress Nemanjin Grad or Nemanjića Grad (Nemanja's Town in Serbian), and Orthodox ceremonies are often held at the location. The name Nemanjin grad for this site is to believed to have originated from King Nikola of Montenegro, who popularized this name upon freeing Podgorica from the Ottoman Empire in 1879.

References 

Buildings and structures in Podgorica
Tourist attractions in Podgorica
Ottoman architecture in Montenegro